Dabataag  is a town in the Sool region of Somaliland/Somalia.It is about 40 miles south of Las Anod, the regional capital of Sool.

References 

Populated places in Sool, Somaliland